Smyrna Airport  is a public use airport located one nautical mile (2 km) east of the central business district of Smyrna, in Kent County, Delaware, United States. It is privately owned by Barbara Jones.

Facilities and aircraft 
It has one runway designated 10/28 with a turf surface measuring 2,600 by 125 feet (792 x 38 m). For the 12-month period ending March 10, 2009, the airport had 2,300 general aviation aircraft operations, an average of 191 per month.

References

External links 
  at Delaware DOT website
 

Airports in Kent County, Delaware